Furlong Creek may refer to:

Furlong Creek (Antarctica)
Furlong Creek (South Dakota)